Ahmad Massoud (Pashto/, ; born 1989) is an Afghan politician who is the founder and Leader of the National Resistance Front of Afghanistan. He is the eldest son of anti-Soviet military leader Ahmad Shah Massoud. He was appointed as the CEO of Massoud Foundation in November 2016. On 5 September 2019, he was declared his father's successor at his mausoleum in the Panjshir Valley. As a result, he has sometimes been referred to as "The Young Lion of Panjshir". After the Taliban seized control of Panjshir Valley on 6 September 2021, Massoud fleed to Tajikistan along with former Vice President Amrullah Saleh and currently lives there.

Early life and education
Ahmad Massoud was born in 1989. He is the only son and the oldest of Ahmad Shah Massoud's six children.

After attending high school in Iran, Massoud trained at the Royal Military Academy Sandhurst. In 2012, he commenced an undergraduate degree in war studies at King's College London, where he obtained his bachelor's degree in 2015. He obtained his master's degree in international politics from City, University of London in 2016. His undergraduate and postgraduate dissertation topics were the Taliban.

Career
Massoud returned to Afghanistan and was appointed CEO of the Massoud Foundation in 2016.

Since March 2019, Massoud has officially entered politics, a widely anticipated move for one referred to in Panjshir as the "predestined." He has endorsed his father's idea of a Swiss model for internal power relations in Afghanistan, saying that the decentralization of government and the de-concentration of power from Kabul would give a more efficient allocation of resources and authority to provinces in the country, thereby bringing prosperity and stability to the country as a whole.

Massoud objected to the direction of the Afghan peace process in 2019, which he believed did not represent the interests of all Afghans. In September of that year, he announced the creation of a new coalition of mujahideen leaders modeled on the Northern Alliance that resisted the Taliban in the 1990s. The coalition, known as the Second Resistance or National Resistance Front of Afghanistan, became one of several independent military forces built up ahead of the United States military withdrawal. After most of the country surrendered to the Taliban during its 2021 offensive, Massoud and First Vice President Amrullah Saleh met in Panjshir and declared their rejection of Taliban rule. He appealed in the American press for military and logistical support for his forces. Among other reasons, he listed the need to protect women's rights, prevent public executions, and avoid the return of a safe haven in Afghanistan for international terrorists.

On 22 August 2021, he warned of a potential civil war if there is not a power-sharing agreement and said that war was "unavoidable" under those circumstances, saying "We defeated the Soviet Union, we can defeat the Taliban". He has founded the National Resistance Front of Afghanistan (NRF) which has thousands of fighters. Massoud has asked the U.S., France and others in Europe and the Arab world to support the NRF. He has also stated his desire to negotiate with the Taliban, but that if talks fail he is ready for a military confrontation.

On 6 September, with the Taliban taking control of the Panjshir Valley, Massoud moved to an unknown location and said the resistance will continue. On 9 September, Massoud's spokesman Ali Maisam Nazary stated that both Massoud and acting Islamic Republic of Afghanistan President Amrullah Saleh were "safe" and still in Afghanistan. Nazary also disputed reports that the Taliban had full control of the Province, stating that 60% was still under National Resistance Front control, and stated that NRF forces made a "tactical withdrawal" from some areas. On 8 September French intellectual Bernard-Henri Lévy shared a photo of himself talking to Massoud in Panjshir in 2020 on his Twitter page and also disputed the reports of the Taliban taking full control of the province.

See also

Afghanistan conflict (1978–present)
Ali Maisam Nazary

References

External links

1989 births
Living people
Afghan Tajik people
Afghan Muslims
Afghan politicians
Politicians of Panjshir Province
Alumni of King's College London
Alumni of City, University of London